The Democratic People's Party was a short-lived political party in South West Africa led by Joey Julius. Julius broke away from the Liberal Party in 1982 in reaction to Barney Barnes' election as party leader the preceding year. Soon after its formation, it merged into the Christian Democratic Union.

References

Defunct political parties in Namibia
Political parties established in 1982
1982 establishments in South West Africa